Louping-ill is an acute viral disease primarily of sheep that is characterized by a biphasic fever, depression, ataxia, muscular incoordination, tremors, posterior paralysis, coma, and death. Louping-ill is a tick-transmitted disease whose occurrence is closely related to the distribution of the primary vector, the sheep tick Ixodes ricinus. It also causes disease in red grouse, and can affect humans. The name 'louping-ill' is derived from an old Scottish word describing the effect of the disease in sheep whereby they 'loup' or spring into the air.

Cause 

Louping ill is caused by RNA virus called Louping ill virus. Louping ill virus belongs to genus Flavivirus, family Flaviviridae.

There are four subtypes: British, Irish, Spanish and Turkish.

Prevention 
According to a ProMED article, disease in sheep has been controlled in the UK by a vaccine (ATCvet code: QI04AA01), originally developed by Scotland's Moredun Research Institute by Prof John Russell Greig. In 2009, however, a shortage of vaccine combined with an increase in the number of ticks found in sheep pasture areas cause an increased risk of this disease.

References

External links 

 Moredun Research Institute vaccine article
 WHO vaccine listing)

Sheep and goat diseases
Animal viral diseases
Viral encephalitis
Flaviviridae